The former LaFayette Hotel is a historic commercial building at 525 South Louisiana Street in downtown Little Rock, Arkansas.  It is a twelve-story concrete structure, faced primarily in brick.  It has a rectangular footprint at its base, with an L-shaped tower facing the street fronts of South Louisiana and Sixth Street.  Its facades are decorated with terra cotta panels, and it is crowned by a pressed metal cornice.  Its main entrances are marked by projecting marquees of cast iron.  The hotel was designed by St. Louis architect George Barnett and was built in 1925.  The hotel operated until 1933, opening again after World War II until closing in 1973.

The building was listed on the National Register of Historic Places in 1982.

See also
National Register of Historic Places listings in Little Rock, Arkansas

References

Hotel buildings on the National Register of Historic Places in Arkansas
Buildings and structures completed in 1925
Buildings and structures in Little Rock, Arkansas
National Register of Historic Places in Little Rock, Arkansas
Historic district contributing properties in Arkansas